Purging is a cleaning process of injection molding to clean thermoplastics molding machines and extruders. This process is very important as a virgin resin cannot effectively remove previous resin residuals from the previous run.

Method
Below are the major steps for purging-
Turn off the material flow in the injection molding machine
Turn off the colorant flow which is added or applied in order to change the colour of a material 
Maintain existing process settings and continue manufacturing plastics parts
When last part is completed, set the nozzle retraction mode
Clean hopper and colorant blender (whichever necessary)
Load any commercial purging material or new material to be used into hopper feed zone
Clean nozzle and sprue bushing by making few shots
Continue purging until most of the commercial purging material is out of the hopper
Feed at least one injection capacity of the next production resin to rinse out any residuals
Start the next production with new resin

References 

Injection molding
Plastics industry